Oblivion is the second single from Crack the Skye by American progressive metal band Mastodon. It is their second-most successful single and song from Crack the Skye, reaching #30 on the Hot Mainstream Rock Tracks chart; however, it has since been surpassed by "Curl of the Burl," which peaked at #16. It is the opening track on the band's live album Live At The Aragon.

Music video
The music video alternates between clips of the band playing in a wasteland, and clips of each member on a space station, aptly named 'Skyelab'. They seem to be trying to repair the space station. Dailor is outside the station, frozen and not wearing his helmet at the beginning of the video, with Sanders attempting to retrieve him with a mechanical arm. Eventually, Sanders gives up and Hinds is given the task to effect repairs to the space station. While he is outside, he begins to see strange lights, which are also noticed by Kelliher. Hinds takes off his helmet and is killed instantly, while Kelliher exits through the airlock and also dies. Sanders dons a space suit to continue the repairs, but stops to look at the others who have fallen as the video ends.

The video won the Best Video title at the 2009 Kerrang! Awards. According to Brann Dailor, the video was influenced by Stanley Kubrick's science fiction film 2001: A Space Odyssey.

Charts

Personnel
Mastodon
 Brann Dailor – drums, vocals
 Troy Sanders – bass guitar, vocals 
 Brent Hinds – guitar, vocals 
 Bill Kelliher – guitar

Other appearances
An instrumental version of "Oblivion" appears on the PC, Xbox 360 and PlayStation 3 video game, Brütal Legend.

References

Mastodon (band) songs
2009 singles
Song recordings produced by Brendan O'Brien (record producer)
2009 songs
Reprise Records singles